Raymond Clyde Morgan (February 12, 1897 – February 5, 1953) was an American football and basketball coach. He served as the head football coach of three different schools: Susquehanna University from 1926 to 1927, Lock Haven University from 1929 to 1930, and Murray State University in 1931, compiling a career college football coaching record of 20–21–1.

Head coaching record

Football

References

External links
 

1897 births
1953 deaths
Basketball coaches from Ohio
Lock Haven Bald Eagles football coaches
Lock Haven Bald Eagles men's basketball coaches
Murray State Racers football coaches
Players of American football from Dayton, Ohio
Purdue Boilermakers football players
Susquehanna River Hawks football coaches
Susquehanna River Hawks men's basketball coaches
Sportspeople from Dayton, Ohio